Next City is a national urban affairs magazine and non-profit organization based in Philadelphia.

First published in March 2003 as a magazine known as The Next American City, Next City promotes socially, economically and environmentally sustainable practices in urban areas across the country and examines how and why cities are changing. It covers topics such as planning, transportation, urban economies, housing and environmental issues.

History 
The magazine, originally named The Next American City, was founded in late 2002 by former college classmates Seth Brown, Adam Gordon, and Anika Singh Lemar. The first issue was distributed in spring of 2003, receiving favorable coverage in The New York Times, and The Baltimore Sun, among others. First based in New Haven, Connecticut, and later moving to its current hometown of Philadelphia, NAC operated as a quarterly print product for eight years. Its title was shortened to Next American City in 2008.

Beginning in 2008, editor and publisher Diana Lind expanded Next City's events series to incorporate an annual leadership summit called "Vanguard" and its new media conference "Open Cities: New Media's Role in Shaping Urban Policy." The magazine's exposure widened beyond urban policy circles, with coverage in Monocle, PAPER magazine and elsewhere.

The final print issue of Next American City ran in the summer of 2011. In April 2012, the publication was renamed Next City and moved primarily online, with occasional pieces issued in print, such as their annual "Solutions of the Year" special issue magazine.

Awards 
Winner, Best Association / Nonprofit Website, Folio: Eddie Award, 2009
Nominee, Best Social/Cultural Coverage, Utne Reader, 2009 
Winner, Best Redesign, Folio: Ozzie Award, 2008
Nominee, Best Social/Cultural Coverage, Utne Reader, 2007

References

External links
Official website

Online magazines published in the United States
Quarterly magazines published in the United States
Magazines established in 2003
Magazines disestablished in 2012
Online magazines with defunct print editions
Professional and trade magazines
Urban studies and planning magazines
Magazines published in Philadelphia